Jakkur Lake is among the biggest lakes in Bangalore, and is located on the northern side of the city. It derives its name from the name of the locality, Jakkur.

References

Further reading

External links
India water portal 
Citizen matters
Deccan herald
Bangalore mirror
Bangalore first

Lakes of Bangalore